Beck Head is a village in Cumbria, England.

References

Villages in Cumbria
South Lakeland District